Nicole Marussi Reis Camargo (born 26 January 2004), known as Nicole Marussi, is a Brazilian footballer who plays as a midfielder for Corinthians.

Club career
Marussi was born in Salto, São Paulo, and represented Santos as a youth.

Marussi scored her first senior goal on 13 December 2020, netting the opener in a 2–0 home win over São Paulo, for the year's Copa Paulista. The following 22 January, she signed her first professional contract with Santos.

On 28 December 2022, Marussi left the club after her contract was due to expire. Exactly one month later, she joined Corinthians, being initially assigned to the youth setup.

Honours
Santos
: 2020

References

2004 births
Living people
Brazilian people of Italian descent
People from Salto, São Paulo
Brazilian women's footballers
Women's association football midfielders
Campeonato Brasileiro de Futebol Feminino Série A1 players
Santos FC (women) players
Footballers from São Paulo (state)